The 2018 Kingston upon Thames Council election took place on 3 May 2018 to elect members of Kingston upon Thames Council in England. This was on the same day as other local elections.

Overall results 
The Liberal Democrats gained control from the Conservatives. The Liberal Democrats won 39 seats (+21), the Conservatives won 9 seats (-19) and Labour lost its only seats in Norbiton (-2).

Results by ward

Alexandra

Berrylands

Beverley 

Mary Clark was a sitting councillor, but for Old Malden ward.

Canbury

Chessington North & Hook 

Phil Doyle was a sitting councillor, but for Grove ward.

Chessington South

Coombe Hill 

Ian George was a sitting councillor, but for Alexandra ward.

Coombe Vale

Grove

Norbiton

Old Malden

St James

St Mark's

Surbiton Hill

Tolworth & Hook Rise

Tudor

2018-2022 by-elections

2021 Chessington South by-election 

The Liberal Democrats selected former Labour MP Andrew Mackinlay as their candidate. Labour selected Charles Bamford, whose mother was a former Liberal Democrat councillor. Noticeably, the Official Monster Raving Loony Party stood thirteen candidates.

References

Kingston upon Thames
2018